James Marsalis (born October 10, 1945) is an American former professional football player who was a cornerback for nine seasons in the American Football League (AFL) and National Football League (NFL). He played college football at Tennessee A&I before playing professionally from 1969 through 1977. He helped the AFL's Kansas City Chiefs beat the defending league champion New York Jets in the first game of the 1969 AFL playoffs, making two interceptions off the Jets' Joe Namath.  Following that, he started in the Fourth AFL-NFL World Championship Game for the Chiefs, defeating the Minnesota Vikings in the last World Championship game played between the AFL and NFL champions.  Marsalis was selected by Pro Football Weekly as the 1969 AFL Defensive Rookie of the Year.

References

1945 births
Living people
People from Pascagoula, Mississippi
Players of American football from Mississippi
American football cornerbacks
Tennessee State Tigers football players
Kansas City Chiefs players
American Football League All-Star players
American Conference Pro Bowl players
New Orleans Saints players
American Football League players